This is a list of when the first color television broadcasts were transmitted to the general public. Non-public field tests, closed-circuit demonstrations and broadcasts available from other countries are not included.

List in alphabetical order

List of territories that never had black and white television
Countries and territories that never had black and white television (i.e., their first broadcasts were in color) are not included in the table above.

 
 
 
 
  (Bechuanaland)
 
 
 
 
  (Swaziland)
 
 
 
 
 
 
 
 
  (Nyasaland)
  (South West Africa)
 
 
 
 
 
 
 
 
 
 
 
  (Ceylon)
  (Tanganyika)
 
 
 
  Zanzibar

See also 
 Geographical usage of television
 Timeline of the introduction of television in countries

References 

History of television
Television, Color
Introduction of color
Television technology